Aria is an animated short film, directed by Pjotr Sapegin and released in 2001. A Canadian-Norwegian coproduction, the film is a stop-motion animation version of Madame Butterfly, set to an arrangement by Normand Roger of excerpts from Giacomo Puccini's original opera.

The film was a Genie Award nominee for Best Animated Short at the 22nd Genie Awards in 2002, and won an Amanda Award for Best Short Film at the Norwegian International Film Festival in 2002.

References

External links

2001 animated films
2001 films
2000s animated short films
National Film Board of Canada animated short films
2001 short films
Canadian animated short films
Norwegian animated short films
2000s Canadian films